Sifalimumab is a human monoclonal antibody designed for the treatment of SLE, dermatomyositis, and polymyositis. It targets interferon a.

Sifalimumab was developed by MedImmune; as of 2017 development had been terminated in favor of moving a competing internal product, anifrolumab, into Phase III trials.

References 

Monoclonal antibodies
AstraZeneca brands